The Queen's Award for Enterprise: Sustainable Development (International Trade Export) (2011) was awarded on 21 April 2011, by Queen Elizabeth II.

The following organisations were awarded this year.

Recipients 
Active Operations Management International LLP of Reading, Berkshire for their standards and best practice processes for delivering operational excellence in service operations.
Addmaster (UK) Limited of Stafford for performance enhancing additives to improve product properties such as antimicrobial efficacy.
Advanced Electronics Limited of Cramlington, Northumberland for electronic fire detection and life safety equipment.
Aerotron Limited of Crawley, West Sussex for aircraft component product support.
AES Engineering Ltd t/a Aesseal of Rotherham, South Yorkshire for mechanical seals and sealing systems.
Allmakes Limited of Abingdon, Oxfordshire for Land Rover parts and accessories.
Altek Europe Limited of Castle Donington, Derbyshire for aluminium processing products and services.
AXA PPP International of Tunbridge Wells, Kent for private medical insurance.
Barrett Dixon Bell Limited of Altrincham, Cheshire as a full service trade, technical & scientific marketing communications agency.
Blackstar Amplification Limited of Northampton for guitar amplifiers and pedals.
Bonds Limited of Castle Eden, County Durham for steel castings.
Bridgehead International Limited of Melton Mowbray, Leicestershire as a strategic healthcare consultancy to the pharmaceutical, biotechnology and healthcare sectors.
Buhler Sortex Limited of London for high speed optical sorters for cleaning post-harvest crops.
CARES Limited of Ashford, Kent as consulting civil engineers.
Centre for Advanced Studies Ltd t/a City of London College of London for international education.
Chain Reaction Cycles Limited of Doagh, Ballyclare for bicycles and specialist cycle components.
Chameleon Communications International Limited of London for medical education and marketing communications services to the pharmaceutical industry.
RS Clare and Co. Limited of Liverpool, Merseyside for grease lubricants, road marking and anti-skid surface products.
ClinTec International Limited of Glasgow for the provision of expert clinical research services.
CobraUK Automotive Products Division Limited of Welshpool, Powys for automotive interiors products.
Colorite Europe Limited of Belfast for PVC compounds.
Craneware plc of Edinburgh for revenue integrity software.
Crystalox Limited of Abingdon, Oxfordshire for multicrystalline silicon for the solar cell industry.
CWC Group Limited of London for the organisation of conferences, exhibitions and training.
Deep Sea Electronics Plc of Filey, North Yorkshire for electronic control solutions for standby power generators and engines.
Delcam Plc of Birmingham for CADCAM software.
DiGiCo UK Limited of Chessington, Surrey for digital audio mixing consoles.
Dunlop Aircraft Tyres Limited of Erdington, Birmingham for aircraft tyres.
EDS Group Holdings Limited of Sheffield, South Yorkshire as a decommissioning services contractor (demolition, asbestos removal & land remediation).
ENTEK International Limited of Heswall, Wirral for battery separators for lead acid car and truck starter batteries.
Fine and Rare Wines Limited of London for fine and rare wines.
FlavorActiV Limited of Chinnor, Oxfordshire for taster training and management for the beverage industry.
J W Galloway Limited of Bridge of Allan, Stirlingshire for beef and lamb products.
GE Aircraft Engine Services Limited of Nantgarw, Cardiff for the overhaul, repair & maintenance of aircraft engines and components.
Genesys International Limited of Middlewich, Cheshire for speciality antiscalant and cleaning chemicals for the desalination industry.
Genuine Solutions Limited of Chessington, Surrey for mobile phone accessories.
Global Digital Systems Limited of Hook, Hampshire for hardware and software used in geotechnical engineering for testing mechanical properties of soils and rocks.
Haskoning UK Limited of Peterborough for 	engineering and environmental consultancy.
HiBreeds International Limited of Old Catton, Norwich for fertile chicken hatching eggs.
High-Point Rendel Limited of London for engineering, procurement & construction project consultants.
Hilditch Group Limited of Malmesbury, Wiltshire for surplus medical and other equipment.
Hyder Consulting Plc of London as an engineering consultancy. 
I D Business Solutions Limited of Guildford, Surrey for data management and analytics software for R&D and healthcare.
ICAP plc of London as an interdealer broker and provider of post trade risk and information services.
Igloo Books Limited of Sywell, Northamptonshire for children's and adults books.
Inertial Systems Limited of Plymouth, Devon for inertial measurement products for precision control and ground proximity warnings software for military pilots.
Infrared Integrated Systems Limited of Swan Valley, Northamptonshire for thermal detectors and systems for thermal imaging, people counting, queue management and security applications.
International Export Supplies Limited of Needham Market, Suffolk for automotive and motorsport components.
James Halstead plc of Radcliffe, Greater Manchester for commercial floor coverings.
Korala Associates Limited of Sunnyside, Edinburgh for multi-vendor ATM software.
Lastolite Limited of Coalville, Leicestershire for photographic lighting and background accessories.
Lo-Q plc of Twyford, Berkshire for queue management reservation systems for theme parks and leisure venues.
Lund Halsey Console Systems Limited of Aylesbury, Buckinghamshire for specialist control room technical furniture.
LycoRed Limited of Aylesford, Kent for nutritional blends for use in the fortification of foods.
Macuk Neuroscience Limited of Blackpool, Lancashire for clinical research services.
Magstim Company Limited of Whitland, Carmarthenshire for neural stimulators and intraoperative nerve monitors.
Malvern Instruments Limited of Malvern, Worcestershire for scientific instrumentation for the measurement of physical and chemical properties of materials.
Mangajo UK Limited of Hayes, Middlesex for green tea and redbush tea based soft drinks. 
Martin-Baker Aircraft Co. Limited of Uxbridge, Middlesex for military aircrew survival systems. 
Media Analytics Limited of Oxford as a publisher of reports, newsletters and conference organisers.
Metal Interests Limited of Chichester, West Sussex for metal recycling.
Microgard Limited of Hull, East Yorkshire for limited life industrial clothing.
Middlesex University Higher Education Corporation of London for English language training, higher education & accommodation.
Miller and Miller (Chemicals) Limited of Hainault, Essex for pharmaceuticals and equipment use in hospitals.
Morgan Innovation & Technology Limited of Petersfield, Hampshire for medical and other electronic devices.
Norbrook Laboratories Limited of Newry, County Down for veterinary and human pharmaceuticals.
OpTek Ltd of Abingdon, Oxfordshire for laser systems.
Optimal Performance Limited of Clifton, Bristol for research and consultancy to improve health & performance in physically demanding occupations.
Oxford Instruments Plasma Technology of Yatton, Bristol for high performance capital equipment for the semi-conductor industry.
Pandrol UK Limited of Worksop, Nottinghamshire for railway fastenings and track support systems.
Peak Scientific Instruments Limited of Inchinnan, Renfrewshire for gas generators.
Plant Parts Limited of Hadleigh, Suffolk for spare parts and final drives for construction machinery.
Portmeirion Group PLC of Stoke-on-Trent, Staffordshire for homewares and accessories.
Prism Media Products Limited of Stretham, Cambridgeshire for equipment & software for music, broadcast & film sound production and audio testing in manufacturing.
Probiotics International Limited of South Petherton, Somerset for probiotic based products for animals and humans.
Rayburn Trading Company of Manchester for own-brand health and beauty & household products.
RealVNC Limited of Cambridge for remote access software for computers and mobile devices.
Rofin-Sinar UK Limited of Willerby, East Riding of Yorkshire for lasers and laser systems.
Russell IPM Limited of Deeside, Flintshire for insect pheromones based products.
Sciencesoft Limited of Glasgow for reservoir engineering visualisation and data analysis software for the oil and gas industry.
Severn Glocon of Quedgeley, Gloucestershire for bespoke severe service control and choke valves.
Sleev-it Fire Systems Limited of Rainham, Kent for penetration pipe seals.
Smart Voucher Ltd t/a Ukash of London for a financial service for cash-based consumers which enables online payments and remittance.
Softbox Systems Limited of Long Crendon, Buckinghamshire for temperature controlled packaging solutions.
Solufeed Limited of Barnham, Bognor Regis for speciality fertilisers.
Speciality Paperboard Containers Limited of Rotherham, South Yorkshire for speciality paperboard packaging.
Sun Mark Limited of Greenford, Middlesex for groceries, soft drinks & household toiletries.
Thales Missile Electronics Limited of Basingstoke, Hampshire for safety and arming units and defence electronics.
Thales Optronics Limited of Glasgow for optronic day and night-vision equipment and systems.
Thermserve Limited of Telford, Shropshire for equipment for processing primary and secondary aluminium.
Tiger Filtration Limited of Pallion, Sunderland for compressed air & gas filtration products.
Toby Churchill Limited of Over, Cambridgeshire for speech communication aids.
Trio Healthcare Limited of Skipton, North Yorkshire for skin care products for the ostomy, incontinence and wound care sectors of the healthcare industry.
Trustees of the London Clinic Limited of London for medical and surgical diagnosis and treatment.
UHV Design Limited of Lewes, East Sussex for high specification manipulation for use at ultra high vacuum for both pioneering research & production.
UK Carbon & Graphite Co. Ltd of Belper, Derbyshire for carbon and graphite components.
Ukash of London, for its geographical and financial growth
Uniline Safety Systems Limited of Redditch, Worcestershire for engineered fall protection, access and rescue solutions.
United Corporation Limited of Wallington, Surrey for procurement and supply of various spares to the oil and gas industries.
University of Bedfordshire of Luton, Bedfordshire for higher education.
University of Manchester of Oxford Road, Manchester for degrees in higher education.
ZED Tunnel Guidance Limited of Walton on Thames, Surrey for guidance systems for tunnelling machines.
Zenith Oilfield Technology Limited of Inverurie, Aberdeenshire for technology equipment and services to the oil industry.

References

Queen's Award for Enterprise: International Trade (Export)
2011 awards in the United Kingdom